Dominum may refer to:
Dominum directum, the right of the feudal lord to direct in the disposition of an asset, typically land
Dominum et vivificantem ("The Lord and Giver of Life"), the name of the fifth encyclical written by Pope John Paul II
Laudate Dominum, the opening words of a Roman Catholic hymn